RocketDock is an application launcher developed by PolyVector and Skunkie of Punk Labs, working with artist Zachary Denton, for Windows that provides a dock similar to that of the Mac OS X Aqua GUI. It is freely available under a Creative Commons license and is distributed by Punk Labs (previously called Punk Software).

RocketDock is able to show live updates of minimized windows as in Mac OS X, and in Windows Vista it can show live thumbnail updates on the taskbar. It is compatible with MobyDock, ObjectDock, RK Launcher, and Y'z Dock skins, and is compatible with and borrows from Stardock ObjectDock's publicly published Docklet API.

The RocketDock gallery had a thriving community where users could upload and share skins, icons, docklets, wallpapers and other customization resources for the application. However, PunkLabs closed the RocketDock gallery on 6 August, 2018. Visiting the link now redirects to the official site of the developers of RocketDock, where a download for RocketDock is available.

See also
 Dock (computing)
 Objectdock
 List of dock applications

References
 Seth Rosenblatt, (5 December 2007), CNET editors' review, CNet
 Preston Gralla, Editorial Review of RocketDock, PC World

External links
RocketDock website (now redirected to punklabs.com)
Punk Labs website
Rocketdock at Deviantart

Application launchers
Windows-only freeware
Portable software